Kraków Metropolitan Area (pl. Krakowski Obszar Metropolitalny) is a peculiar functional region including a big city - Kraków and neighbouring complex of settling units, connected with the metropolis by different interactive relations. Area including the city of Kraków and neighbouring powiats.

The Małopolskie Voivodship Spatial Development Plan admitted by the resolution No. XV/174/03 of the Małopolskie Voivodship Regional Council, dated 22 December 2003, determined the extent of the metropolitan area, consisting of:
 Kraków – largest city
 powiat bocheński – gminas:
 urban – Bochnia,
 urban-rural – Nowy Wiśnicz,
 rural – Bochnia, Drwinia, Łapanów, Rzezawa, Trzciana, Żegocina,
 powiat krakowski – gminas:
 urban-rural – Krzeszowice, Skała, Skawina, Słomniki, Świątniki Górne,
 rural – Czernichów, Igołomia-Wawrzeńczyce, Iwanowice, Jerzmanowice-Przeginia, Kocmyrzów-Luborzyca, Liszki, Michałowice, Mogilany, Sułoszowa, Wielka Wieś, Zabierzów, Zielonki,
 powiat miechowski – gminas:
 rural – Gołcza,
 powiat myślenicki – gminas:
 urban-rural – Dobczyce, Myślenice, Sułkowice,
 rural – Lubień, Pcim, Raciechowice, Siepraw, Tokarnia, Wiśniowa, 
 powiat olkuski – gminas:
 rural – Trzyciąż,
 powiat proszowicki – gminas:
 urban-rural – Proszowice,
 rural – Koniusza, Koszyce, Nowe Brzesko, 
 powiat wadowicki - gminas:
 urban-rural – Kalwaria Zebrzydowska, Wadowice,
 rural – Brzeźnica, Lanckorona, Stryszów, 
 powiat wielicki – gminas:
 urban-rural – Niepołomice, Wieliczka, 
 rural – Biskupice, Gdów, Kłaj.

See also
 Metropolitan areas in Poland

References

Metropolitan areas of Poland
Geography of Kraków